Techno Animal Versus Reality is a remix album by the Illbient band Techno Animal, released on 30 March 1998 through City Slang.

Track listing

Personnel 
Techno Animal
Justin Broadrick – production
Kevin Martin – photography, design, production
Additional musicians and production
Simon Heyworth – mastering

References

External links 
 

1998 albums
1998 remix albums
City Slang albums
Techno Animal albums